The Mushroom House or Pod House is a contemporary residence in the town of Perinton, New York, which has been featured in television programs (notably HGTV's Offbeat America series) and books (notably the Weird U.S. series) due to its whimsical appearance.  Patterned after umbels of Queen Anne's Lace, its brown color is more suggestive of mushrooms.  The house was constructed for attorney-artist couple Robert and Marguerite Antell between 1970 and 1972 and was designated a town landmark in 1989.

The structure is sited in a moderately-wooded ravine adjacent to Powder Mills Park.  The house itself comprises four 80 ton pods which rest on reinforced concrete stems of 14 to 20 feet in height. These fan out from three feet in diameter where they connect to the pods to five feet at the base.  The sides of each pod's "cap" are completely windowed.  One pod serves as the living and dining area, one as the kitchen, and two as sleeping areas.  An additional "half pod" provides an open deck area. The house has three bedrooms and three bathrooms in 4,168 square feet.

In February 2012, the house sold for $799,900, after the original asking price of $1.1 million failed to attract a buyer.

See also
 Earl Young (architect)

References

External links
Architect's photos
RocWiki article
More Photos

 Houses completed in 1970
 Houses in Monroe County, New York